Anastasia Toma (born 11 February 1996) is a Moldovan footballer who plays as a forward and has appeared for the Moldova women's national team.

Career
Toma has been capped for the Moldova national team, appearing for the team during the 2019 FIFA Women's World Cup qualifying cycle.

References

External links
 
 
 

1996 births
Living people
Moldovan women's footballers
Women's association football forwards
Moldova women's international footballers
Moldovan expatriate women's footballers
Moldovan expatriates in Cyprus
Expatriate women's footballers in Cyprus